Nang Phaya is a village and tambon (sub-district) of Tha Pla District, in Uttaradit Province, Thailand. In 2005 it had a population of  2,593 people. The tambon contains six villages.

References

Tambon of Uttaradit province
Populated places in Uttaradit province